Fadel Fadel (October 6, 1914 – September 23, 1969) was a president of Clube de Regatas do Flamengo. Flamengo's Parque Aquático Fadel Fadel (Fadel Fadel Aquatic Park) is named in his honor.

Biography
Born in Sumidouro, in the state of Rio de Janeiro, of Lebanese descent, he was elected president of Flamengo in 1962, leaving the position in 1965. During his administration, he inaugurated the club's Olympic pool in 1963. Flamengo won the Campeonato Carioca in 1963 and in 1965 during his administration.

He died on September 23, 1969 in Rio de Janeiro.

References

1914 births
1969 deaths
Brazilian people of Lebanese descent
CR Flamengo directors and chairmen
People from Rio de Janeiro (state)
Sportspeople of Lebanese descent